The Movement for the Sick was a political party of Portugal, from 2002 to 2007.

The movement claimed its main goals were to promote de defense of social rights namely health rights and the ethical humanism from Portuguese culture.

They ran for the 2004 European Parliament election, getting 0.4% of the votes (about 14 thousand votes).

References

External links
 Official site (2007 archived, Portuguese version)
 Official site (2011 archived, English version)

Defunct political parties in Portugal